Freewave is the debut extended play by American hip hop recording artist Lucki. It was released on October 19, 2015.

Background
A few months after the release of his third mixtape, X, Lucki started releasing freestyles to his extended play Freewave EP. At first, they were single songs, but soon announced they were to be a part of the upcoming EP; he first released Freewave Freestyle and Back Home, and soon followed with Freewave 3, 4, 5, and 7. The EP consisted of ten songs, the tenth song titled Rumors added a couple of weeks later.

Reception

Engine Start Media gave Freewave an 8.7/10 rating stating that "Eck$ may not be a conventional rapper or conscious rapper that many look for, but you have to give him his credit when it comes to creating a subgenre of hip-hop that hardly any contemporary artist has yet to venture into."

Track listing

References

2015 debut EPs
Lucki albums